Pothoidium is a monotypic genus of flowering plants in the family Araceae. The single species that comprises the genus is Pothoidium lobbianum. It is native to Maluku, Sulawesi, the Philippines, and Lan Yü Island (Orchid Island) of Taiwan.

References

Pothoideae
Monotypic Araceae genera
Flora of Malesia
Flora of Taiwan